Eugene G. Oberst (July 23, 1901 – May 30, 1991) was an American football player, track and field athlete, coach of football and basketball, and college athletics administrator.  A native of Owensboro, Kentucky, he played football at the University of Notre Dame in the 1920s under coach Knute Rockne, and competed in track and field as a javelin thrower.  He won the Olympic bronze medal at the 1924 Summer Games in Paris.  Oberst served as the head football coach at Washington and Lee University (1929–1930), Canisius College (1931–1932), and John Carroll University (1946).

Football career
Oberst, who was listed at 6' 5" (1.96 m) and 203 lbs (92 kg), was a right tackle for the Notre Dame Fighting Irish in 1920, 1922, and 1923, wearing uniform No. 30, while missing the 1921 season due to injury. In 1922 and 1923, he was one of Notre Dame's "Seven Mules," the offensive linemen who blocked for the team's legendary Four Horsemen, before those terms were coined during Notre Dame's 1924 national championship season. Oberst's teammates also included halfback George Gipp.

Javelin throw
As the possibly apocryphal story goes, Oberst was walking by a Notre Dame track and field practice one day when a javelin landed nearby. He picked it up and threw it far beyond the original thrower. Rockne, who coached track and field as well as football, saw the toss, and drafted Oberst on the spot. Oberst was the 1921 NCAA javelin champion, with a throw of 191' 2" (58.27 m). At the 1924 Penn Relays, Oberst's throw of 196' 2 5/8" (59.80 m) beat the meet record by more than 8 feet. Oberst had a disappointing performance at the U.S. Olympic Trials in Cambridge, Massachusetts, finishing in 5th place with a throw of 180' 3" (54.94 m). The U.S. Olympic Committee added Oberst to the Olympic team, anyway, because of his better results at previous meets. The Olympic Trials winner, William Neufeld of UC Berkeley went on to finish 5th at the Olympics.

In Paris, Oberst's throw of 58.35 m won him the bronze medal, behind the defending Olympic champion, Jonni Myyrä of Finland (62.96 m) and Gunnar Lindström of Sweden (60.92 m). Oberst was the first American to win an Olympic medal in the javelin throw, and only seven Americans have medaled since, most notably Babe Didrikson at the 1932 Olympics in Los Angeles.

Oberst's Notre Dame football teammate Tom Lieb also made the 1924 U.S. Olympic team, in the discus throw, and won the bronze medal.

Coaching career
After college, Oberst became a coach, teacher, and athletics administrator. In 1926 and 1927, his football teams at Roman Catholic High School won the championships of the Philadelphia Catholic League, with a combined record of 15–3–1. From 1929 to 1930, Oberst coached the Washington and Lee University Generals, compiling a 6–11–2 record. In 1931 and 1932, Oberst coached at Canisius College, where his record was 2–7–3.

Oberst later moved on to John Carroll College, now John Carroll University, where he finished his career. He was a football line coach for the Blue Streaks from 1936 to 1942. Oberst then served as director of the school's V-12 Navy training program from 1942 to 1946. He was head basketball coach during the 1945–46 season, with a 4–11 record, and head football coach in 1946, with a 1–7 record. Oberst also coached the school's track and field team from 1947 to 1948. Finally, Oberst served as John Carroll's athletic director from 1947 to 1951.

Later years

In 1971, Oberst was inducted into John Carroll University's Athletic Hall of Fame. In 1976, he was inducted into the Greater Cleveland Sports Hall of Fame. Oberst died in Cleveland in 1991.

Head coaching record

Football

Notes

References

External links
 
 

1901 births
1991 deaths
American football tackles
American male javelin throwers
Athletes (track and field) at the 1924 Summer Olympics
Basketball coaches from Kentucky
Medalists at the 1924 Summer Olympics
Olympic bronze medalists for the United States in track and field
Canisius Golden Griffins football coaches
John Carroll Blue Streaks athletic directors
John Carroll Blue Streaks football coaches
John Carroll Blue Streaks men's basketball coaches
Notre Dame Fighting Irish football players
Notre Dame Fighting Irish men's track and field athletes
Washington and Lee Generals football coaches
College track and field coaches in the United States
High school football coaches in Pennsylvania
Sportspeople from Owensboro, Kentucky
Track and field athletes from Kentucky